Glamour is a 1934 American Pre-Code drama film directed by William Wyler and starring Paul Lukas, Constance Cummings and Phillip Reed.

Plot
An ambitious chorus girl marries an up-and-coming composer.

Cast
 Paul Lukas as Victor Banki
 Constance Cummings as Linda Fayne
 Phillip Reed as Lorenzo Valenti
 Joseph Cawthorn as Ibsen
 Doris Lloyd as Nana
 Lyman Williams as Forsyth
 Phil Tead as Jimmy
 Luis Alberni as Monsieur Paul
 Yola d'Avril as Renee
 Alice Lake as Secretary
 Louise Beavers as Millie
 Wilson Benge as Pritchard, the Butler
 Lita Chevret as Grassie
 Olaf Hytten as Dobbs 
 Grace Hayle as Miss Lang 
 May Beatty as Journalist
 Claire Du Brey as Nurse
 C. Montague Shaw as Throat Doctor
 Sheila Bromley as Chorus Girl
 Lois January as Chorus Girl

Reception
The film was a box-office disappointment for Universal.

Preservation status
UCLA archive and Library of Congress are in possession of prints.

References

External links

1934 films
1934 drama films
Films directed by William Wyler
American drama films
American black-and-white films
Films produced by B. F. Zeidman
1930s American films
1930s English-language films